Cepitá is a town and municipality in the García Rovira Province, part of Santander Department in northeastern Colombia.

Municipalities of Santander Department